Horizont Radio or Хоризонт (Horizont) in Bulgarian is a state-owned Bulgarian radio station, specialising in news coverage from Bulgaria. It is the most popular radio station in Bulgaria and it is part of The Bulgarian National Radio Network. Horizon Radio is considered the most independent media in Bulgaria with news and comments from around the nation. It has an extensive network of correspondents in every big city in Bulgaria, ready to report when the news breaks. The programme plays much music from all genres but prominence is given to the latest in the pop charts. The motto of radio Horizon is "Quick and in-depth".

History

Horizon Radio is part of the Bulgarian National Radio. The Bulgarian National Radio (Българско национално радио, ; abbreviated БНР, BNR) is the state-owned national radio network of Bulgaria. It was founded on 30 March 1930 as Rodno radio ("Native radio") by a group of intellectuals. Broadcasting began in June the same year. Off Air on 261 kHz Vakarel Transmitter on Longwave as from 2 jan 2015

BNR has two radio stations in Bulgarian, Horizont and Hristo Botev, as well as a world service called Radio Bulgaria broadcasting in 11 languages (Bulgarian, Russian, English, German, French, Spanish, Serbian, Greek, Albanian, Turkish and Arabic). All stations are also available online.

News coverage
Horizon Radio broadcasts news bulletins on top of the hour with extensive news programmes at 12 pm, 7 pm and midnight. The bulk of the interviews and comments come in mornings and evenings, so that almost everyone in country tunes in first thing in the morning for the latest news. The programme also offers sports news and has a weather forecast every three hours live from the meteorological office.

Music
Horizon Radio is notable for the wide range of music it plays. While most commercial stations concentrate on a particular theme, such as 1980s music or "classic rock", Horizon plays a diverse mix of current songs, including independent/alternative, rock, house/electronica, drum 'n' bass, world, pop and rap. In recent years the radio has attracted many teenage listeners because of the quality music the radio plays.

Notable shows

"12+3" kicks off at 12 o'clock and ends at 3 o'clock in the afternoon, hence the name. It's the most popular radio programme in Bulgaria. The show offers pop music, live interviews and comments. The presenters are often young and witty giving the programme a youthful sound.
"A Jump Ahead" kicks off at 7 am and finishes at 10 am concentrating on live interviews and debates.
"Horizon For You" airs listeners' announcements about weddings, birthday parties etc.
"Sunday 150" is broadcast Sundays from 10 am to 12 and is dedicated exclusively to politics.

Broadcast frequencies
Coverage in Bulgaria on FM sorted by frequency.

Horizon Radio is also available on as a web stream. See link below.

See also
Eastern Bloc information dissemination

External links

Horizont at LyngSat Address

References

Eastern Bloc mass media
Radio stations in Bulgaria
Longwave radio stations
Radio stations established in 1930
News and talk radio stations